Le Mans 1955 is a computer-animated short film from 2018 directed by Quentin Baillieux and produced by Nicolas de Rosanbo & Carole Lambert inspired by the 1955 Le Mans disaster. The short has been presented in a number of festivals including in the Clermont-Ferrand International Short Film Festival and the Annecy International Animated Film Festival in 2019, and won awards such as the St. Louis International Film Festival for Best Animated Short Film award, qualifying it for the Oscars.

Plot
24 Hours of Le Mans, 1955. 300,000 spectators are in attendance. Mercedes-Benz's Silver Arrows, fielding an international all-star team of drivers, are the favorites to win. For their team manager, Alfred Neubauer, it is his final race before retirement.  As such, he hopes to win big, and is pinning his hopes on his first team of Juan Manuel Fangio and Stirling Moss. The team's second car, driven by Pierre Levegh and John Fitch, is to support them and make sure they keep the lead. Fitch is disappointed that they aren't being trusted to take the lead spot, but Levegh assures him that they could still be the winning car, as "anything can happen in 24 hours."

The Le Mans start sees early trouble for the Mercedes team when Fangio's car stalls at the start, leaving Levegh as the primary car. As Fitch watches, Levegh tries to catch the leading Jaguar of Mike Hawthorn, while Fangio struggles to make up for lost time. At 6:26 p.m., as the Mercedes drivers are preparing to switch for the next leg, a huge fireball erupts in the stands across from the pits. Fangio, coming in to switch with Moss, reports that the source is Levegh's car, which has left the track and crashed into the crowd, killing eighty-four people.

When he observes the carnage, Fitch urges Neubauer to withdraw Moss's car, which is now running second, but Neubauer is reluctant to abandon his final race. Finally, in the early light of dawn, just as Moss takes the lead, Neubauer makes the decision to pull Mercedes-Benz out of the 24 Hours of Le Mans, declaring, "We are racing drivers, we're not monsters."

Cast
 Nathan Willcocks - John Fitch
 Joe Sheridan - Alfred Neubauer
 Nicholas Mead - Pierre Levegh
 Alonso Venegas Flores - Juan Manuel Fangio

Awards
Since its launch, the film has received numerous awards, and selected in more than 75 festivals around the world.

Historical inaccuracies

 Despite starting the race late due to a technical difficulty, Fangio was actually in second position at the moment of the crash, behind Hawthorn in first. Shortly before the crash, Hawthorn had lapped Levegh (who was in 6th position) and Lance Macklin, who was also involved in the crash. In the film, Levegh is portrayed as challenging Hawthorn for the lead while Fangio is struggling to make his way up the field.
 Neubauer did not have the authority to retire from the race. Such a decision had to be taken by the Mercedes directors in Germany. It took several hours for the directors to be called together, after which they issued the order to retire from the race. In the film, Fitch is shown arguing to Neubauer that the cars should be retired, and Neubauer refusing, at least initially. There does not seem to be supporting evidence for the fact that Neubauer was reluctant to retire the cars (there was a third Mercedes car, number 21, that was not mentioned in the film).
 The fatal crash occurred at 6:26pm on June 11, whereas the film portrays the crash as occurring at night.

References

External links
 
 
 
 

2010s French animated films
2010s animated short films
French animated short films
French auto racing films
2018 computer-animated films
2018 short films
2018 films
2018 television films